"I Can't Believe That It's All Over" is a song written by Ben Peters and recorded and released as a single by American country artist, Skeeter Davis.

The song was recorded at the RCA Victor Studio in Nashville, Tennessee, United States on March 9, 1973. The session was produced by Ronny Light. The song was released as a single in May 1973, reaching the number twelve Billboard Magazine Hot Country Singles chart. It was Davis' first major hit in three years on the country chart. It would also be her final major hit. Additionally, the single reached number one on the Billboard Bubbling Under Hot 100 Singles Chart, her final entry on the pop chart, which had been preceded by a seven-year hiatus. Additionally, the single peaked at number eleven on the Canadian RPM Country Songs chart. It was issued onto Davis' studio album of the same name.

Chart performance

References 

1973 songs
Skeeter Davis songs
Songs written by Ben Peters
1973 singles
RCA Victor singles